Dreams & Chaos is a Naga web series based on writer Sentilong Ozüküm's 2020 book of the same name. The series stars Kilangtemsü Imsong alongside Waluniba Ajem and Limasenla Jamir. The first season aired on YouTube from 13 November 2020 to 25 December 2020. The second season aired between 28 January 2022 and 4 March 2022.

Synopsis
After a quarrel with his policeman father which resulted in a broken windowpane, Moluti finds himself more and more estranged from his father. An attempt by his mother for reconciliation ends up in another bitter quarrel.

Cast

Main
 Kilangtemsü Imsong as Moluti
 Waluniba Ajem as Senti
 Limasenla Jamir as Ali

Supporting
 Lipokümzük Pongen as Moluti's father
 Renemsongla Ozüküm as Moluti's mother
 Merang Lemtür as Vicky
 Sungjemmong Jamir as Moluti's sister
 Imtinaro as Kim

Episodes

Season 1

Season 2

Production

Music
Nokrang Jamir composed the music for the web series and the theme song of the series ‘Teimla’ was composed and sung by Kümzük T. Jamir.

Reception

Awards and nominations

References

External links
 
 Dreams & Chaos on YouTube

Indian drama television series